Adnan Houri (born 13 February 1955) is a Syrian athlete. He competed in the men's discus throw at the 1980 Summer Olympics, finished on 16th place (47.52) and did not qualify to final. Won Pan Arab Games title in shot put. Earned four medals at Arab Championships. Became first Syrian man to break 50 m in discus and 16 m in SP. His shot put record was unbroken for 22 years.

Personal bests
Outdoor
Shot put: 16.09 (Potsdam 1987)
Discus throw: 50.60 (Potsdam 1983)

Competition record

References

External links

1955 births
Living people
Athletes (track and field) at the 1980 Summer Olympics
Syrian male discus throwers
Olympic athletes of Syria
Place of birth missing (living people)
20th-century Syrian people